Bâltanele may refer to several villages in Romania:

 Bâltanele, a village in Greci Commune, Mehedinţi County
 Bâltanele, a village in Prunișor Commune, Mehedinţi County